Dypsis carlsmithii is a species of flowering plant in the family Arecaceae. It is endemic to the eastern lowland rainforests of Madagascar.  It is a rare palm, with fewer than 15 mature individuals identified from two locations in the northeast: Tampolo on the western coast of Masoala Peninsula, and Mahavelona, north of Toamasina, where it grows between 20 and 100 meters elevation. Its trunk grows to 6 m tall and about 40–50 cm in diameter, with mature leaves about 140 cm long by about 80 cm wide.

References

External links
 Palmpedia entry, with photographs

carlsmithii
Endemic flora of Madagascar
Flora of the Madagascar lowland forests
Critically endangered plants